Kępno may refer to the following places:
Kępno in Greater Poland Voivodeship (west-central Poland)
Kępno, Pomeranian Voivodeship (north Poland)
Kępno, Warmian-Masurian Voivodeship (north Poland)
Kępno, Stargard County in West Pomeranian Voivodeship (north-west Poland)
Kępno, Szczecinek County in West Pomeranian Voivodeship (north-west Poland)